Loket Castle is a 12th-century Gothic castle in Loket in the Karlovy Vary Region of the Czech Republic. It ls located on a massive rock, surrounded on three sides by the Ohře river. Once known as "the Impregnable Castle of Bohemia", because of its thick walls, it is one of the oldest stone castles in the country. It is administered by the Loket Castle Foundation since 1993 and preserved today as a museum and national monument.

History
Loket, originally called Stein-Elbogen due to its rocky location, is said to have been founded in 870 by the margraves of Vohenburg who were then related to the dukes of Bavaria to whom the entire Elbogen districts belonged until the 12th century.

The first written mention of Loket as a town comes from a 1234 deed when the first known royal Loket burgrave was recorded. According to archeological investigations, the foundation of the stone castle dates back to the third quarter of the 12th century, during the reign of Přemysl Otakar I, either by the Czech Prince Vladislav I, later the Czech King Vladislaus II of Bohemia, or by ministerial officials to the Emperor Fridrich I Barbarosa. The old romanesque castle comprised two towers, a church and a building standing on the site of the present Margrave's House. The church stood beneath the present castle where St. Wenceslaus church is standing today. The other tower, no longer existent, stood to the north-east of the castle. Above all, the castle served as protection to the merchant's path leading from Prague through Cheb and on to Plauen and Erfurt, but after the re-annexation by the Czech state it began functioning as a frontier fortress. By this time it became the new administrative centre of the region.

By the turn of the 13th century a settlement was built around the castle walls and later raised into a royal town. From the 1250s the castle was gradually enlarged and the formerly Romanesque building turned into a Gothic stronghold which was often visited by the members of the royal family.

During the rule of Ottokar II of Bohemia
Under the rule of Přemysl Otakar II a new fortification wall with half-cylindrical towers was constructed. Queen Eliška Přemyslovna used to hide herself in the castle with her children during the upheavals against John of Luxembourg as well as to protect herself against his anger. The last time she had to hide there was in the early spring of 1319, when King John conquered the castle with a trick when he persuaded the guard to open the gate pretending a friendly visit to his wife. Queen Eliška was taken prisoner and transported to Mělník, the dowry castle of the Czech queens. Their three-year-old son Prince Václav, later Emperor and King Charles IV, was held here for two months in the underground prison, a period which he later described as a horrible imprisonment in a cellar with one tiny window. As an adult and an important European ruler, Charles IV did not come to hate Loket and often stayed there. In his unimplemented code Maiestas Carolina, he classified Loket among the places which should have stayed in permanent property of the Czech crown.

The Hussite Wars did not avoid Loket when it found itself in the hands of the supporter of the Catholic Church burgrave Půta of Illburk. The Hussite troops tried twice to conquer the castle under the leadership of Krušina of Švamberk and later under the leadership of Jakoubek of Vřesovice, but both crusades ended without success. The comprehensive restoration of the castle under Wenceslaus IV was decisive for its present form. Of the original Romanesque buildings, those preserved were mainly the extremely rare rotunda, the foundations of the castle tower and those of the northern palace. The Margave's House also originated in the reign of Wenceslaus IV.

During the rule of Sigismund of Luxemburg
The castle continued to be enlarged up to the 1420s and in 1434 it was mortgaged to chancellor Kašpar Slik by Sigismund of Luxembourg as a reward for his financial aid. Further reconstruction took place in the second half of the 15th century when the castle was turned into a representative ancestral seat under the administration of the House of Slik, which lasted for more than 100 years. It served this purpose even after the House of slik divided itself into several branches – Falknov, Jáchymov and Ostrov. Its architecture followed the spirit of the late Gothic and the new-coming Renaissance.  The Sliks changed the southern palace into a great hall, and the eastern palace into the "Slik Archives". The castle suffered from being converted into a prison in the 19th century.

During the 16th century the House of Slik became one of the wealthiest families in the country and the most powerful in the region. Their era in the Loket castle was one of disputes with the Loket burghers, which often led to acts of violence and open conflict. Due to their participation in the revolt of the Czech states against the king, later Emperor Ferdinand I Habsburg, many of the possessions of the House of Slik were confiscated and eventually they lost the castle. From 1551 to 1562 the castle was administered by the nobility of Plauen, but it was taken from them because of poor administration and conferred to the Loket burghers. In 1598 it became a hereditary legacy to the burghers, serving for administrative purposes only. Every time the town hall faced a disastrous condition the town aldermen held their sessions there.

During the rule of Jiří Popel of Lobkowicz

In 1607 the nobleman Jiří Popel of Lobkovic, who was the highest controller of the Czech kingdom, died of an apoplectic stroke in the loket castle jail. He had been accused of treason and imprisoned in Kladsko for many years. Later he was buried on the site of a former church tower. During the Thirty Years' War the town was afflicted with numerous disasters. At its beginning, Protestant Loket supported the opposition against the Emperor. After the Battle of the White Mountain, the Loket citizens allowed the Mansfeld detachments to enter the town. In 1621 the town was besieged by the Bavarians led by Tilly and after huge bombardment the town was forced to surrender and the Saxons had to leave. The town was then punished for disobedience by extensive repressive measures. This situation recurred again in 1631 when the burghers allowed the Saxons to enter and conquered the town. Swedish troops operating in Loket neighbourhood excluded the town from their attacks, but The Thirty Years' War and the repressive measures by imperial officials brought great economic losses to the town of Loket.

From the 18th century up to modern times
In 1725 the castle was burned down and only the ground floor and the underground of the castle remained. In the beginning of the 19th century the Margrave's House was then rebuilt and a museum of porcelain established. In 1788 a proposal for the reconstruction of the castle into a town prison was put forward, and the work was finished in 1822. During that time a palace called the Stone Chamber in the vicinity of the tower was pulled down and other buildings were lowered by one storey. The prison was abolished in 1948. Since 1968 the castle was administered by the Ancient Monuments Departments in Plzeň. The turning point for the improvement and opening up of the castle came in 1992 when it was returned to the town of Loket once again. The town founded the Loket Castle Foundation which was later transformed into a common welfare corporation.

Sections of the castle
The castle today is divided into nine different parts containing many medieval artefacts of historical interest. Besides the Margrave's House where an exhibition of porcelain is on display and the remains of a Romanesque rotunda, the smallest of its type in the Czech Republic, the castle also features the prison cells and the chamber of torture, the wedding and the ceremonial hall, the historical arms and Archeological hall, where a maquette of the so-called "bewitched burgrave" Elbogen meteorite is on display, a Romanesque prismatic tower, the 15th-century burgrave's house and the captain's house, and a 16th-century palace with two wings and fortifications incorporating strongholds.

Margrave's House
Built in romanesque style, it was finally set up into its present appearance to serve as the town museum in 1907. After recent reconstructions the museum of locally-made porcelain has been re-opened to the public on the first floor. Later, exhibitions were also held in other rooms in the castle. Several tombstones are arranged in a row by the entrance to the building. One of them coming from rabbi Benjamin's Renaissance tomb from the extinct Jewish cemetery, which was situated on the Robičské suburb, with a laudatory poem dating approximately of 1700, while the others come from the former Loket cemetery at St. John's Church.

Archeological hall
During the archeological research in spring 1993, many fragments as well as other materials from the time of the many reconstruction periods in the Loket castle were found. The masonry of the original Romanesque rampart from before 1230, when the castle was built, was then uncovered. They are based directly on the rock and are built entirely of quarry stone. In the upper part of the excavation, below the main window, the walls of the palace from the times of the castle reconstruction during the reign of King Wenceslas and the remains of a Renaissance kitchen dating back to 1528–1536 were also found. In the corner a rectangular foundation for a heating element is also noticeable next to a worn-away stone threshold.

Rotunda
The rotunda, originally hidden in the body of a spiral staircase in the northern part of the castle, indicates its Slavs origin. It probably originated at the end of the 12th century because the complete building concept of a Romanesque castle would otherwise have been an exception in the concept of Premyslid castles of the 12th century. It needs to be added that even historians do not agree whether the castle was the work of the Schtauf or Premyslid architecture.

Cathedral
The Baroque cathedral was erected on the site of the original Gothic church, which was burned down in 1725. The new church was completed in 1734, to a design by Wolfgang Braubock. The altar paintings are attributed to Petr Brandl, and both the valuable side altars were probably the work of the Loket sculptor Jan Wild. When the church was reconstructed, the old churchyard behind the presbytery was restored. A monument to Lord Václav Popel of Lobkovice, imprisoned in Loket and buried in the church crypt, was erected here.

In media
The town centre and castle were both used as locations in the 2006 film Casino Royale, representing a town in Montenegro.

Notes
 Richard Šmíd, Historic Town and Castle – Polypress (1999)
 M'Plan, "Panoramic City Maps" – M'Plan sro. (2005)
 Loket "City Map" – SKHZ (2009)

References

External links

Sokolov District
Castles in the Karlovy Vary Region
Museums in the Karlovy Vary Region